Valdar Jaanusson (1923–1999) was an Estonian-Swedish geologist. In 1960 he introduced the concept of topostratigraphy into Swedish stratigraphy. A recognized expert on the geology of the Ordovician period, he was member of the Estonian Academy of Sciences.

References

1923 births
1999 deaths
Estonian geologists
Estonian emigrants to Sweden
Estonian paleontologists
Estonian World War II refugees
Scientists from Tallinn
20th-century Swedish geologists
Swedish paleontologists
Employees of the Swedish Museum of Natural History
Uppsala University alumni
Academic staff of Uppsala University